Notecianka Pakość is a football club based in Pakość, Poland. They are currently playing in IV liga (level 5th).

The club played in the Poland III Liga during the 1986/87 season and returned having finishing second in the Polish IV liga in 2008–09; although the league was reorganised following the 2007–08 season, meaning they still play in the fourth tier of Polish football.

References

External links
 KS Notecianka Pakość club site (Polish)
 KS Notecianka Pakość at the 90minut.pl website (Polish)

Association football clubs established in 1951
1951 establishments in Poland
Inowrocław County
Football clubs in Kuyavian-Pomeranian Voivodeship